Nadym (Selkup: Ня́рэм, Nấrém) is a town in Yamalo-Nenets Autonomous Okrug, Russia, located on the river Nadym. The population has fluctuated:

Etymology
There are three several translations from the Nenets language:
 "nyadey ya" – mossy place
 "ngede ya" – dry, grassy hill
 "nyada yam" – land of the Nyadong family

History 
The first mention of the city's name appears at the end of the 16th century. The name "Nadym" appears on Russian maps from the end of the 17th century, and the river Nadym was noted in published form at the turn of the 17th and 18th centuries in the "Drawing Book of Siberia" by Russian geographer, cartographer and topographer, Semyon Remezov and sons, composed in 1699–1701. On the map of Tobolsk province of 1802, Nadym was already marked as having significant population. Today it's located 32 kilometers from the mouth of the river Nadym, referred to as Nadym mound.

In 1929, a reindeer farm called "Nadym" was founded on the right bank of the river Nadym. However, in 1934 the farm was disbanded and turned into a factory.

In the fall of 1967, it was chosen as the reference framework for the development of a regional gas-bearing deposit. Surrounded by numerous lakes, the village situated on an elevated dry place was chosen for a runway for aviation. Relatively small, 12 kilometers away from the river Nadym, for which it was named, by the 1950s–1960s, the village began to be called "New Nadym".

In parallel to its accelerated pace of development, the gas company created Medvezhye gas field, with the intention of becoming a social and cultural center of the Tyumen North. In August 1971, Nadym held a groundbreaking ceremony for its first major building and on March 9, 1972 by decree of the Soviet First Secretary the industrial community Nadym was incorporated within the Nadymsky Municipal District as Nadym Urban Settlement.

Economy
The main enterprise of the town is "Nadymgazprom", it's one of the branches of the Gazprom company, which accounts for about 11% of gas produced in Russia. Also, the city contains the largest of the independent gas producers "NOVATEK" (Yurkharovskoye field).

Large construction companies are "Arktikneftegazstroy", "Severgazstroi", and "Nadymdorstroy." Until 2010, their number also included the company "Severtruboprovodstroy", but in April 2011 it was declared bankrupt.

Of Nadym-based oil and gas production, "RITEKNadymneft" (a subsidiary of JSC "RITEK") led development of the Sandibinskogo and Mid-Khulymsk oil fields.

Climate
Nadym experiences a subarctic climate (Köppen climate classification Dfc).

Education

The city has nine schools. A high school, a college (since 2014 PU 4 received the status of college)
and two art schools. The higher education system is represented by four branches of higher educational institutions of Russia:
the branch of Tyumen State University
the branch of Tyumen State Oil and Gas University
the branch of the Moscow University of Psychology and Social
the branch of Tomsk State University of Control Systems and Radio Electronics (TUSUR)
a branch of Tyumen State Architectural University (TyumGASU)

Transportation

Bus routes:
Airport-number 2> n. Forest
Avtostantsiya- number 3> n. Right Bank
Number 4 Finskiy-> 11 th md
Number 5 para. Lesnoy-> 11 th md
Number 6 Street. Ryzhkova-> Administration
Nadym (Airport)

An inactive railway branch passes through Nadym between Novy Urengoy and Salekhard (also called "dead road", a Stalinist-era road). At some point in time a bridge across the Ob river to Salekhard Labytnangi was planned. To date, the only construction is the railway Salekhard-Nadym. Most roads across the river Nadym were opened in September 2015. A bridge across the Ob River is also planned along with a road running parallel to the railroad.

The Nadym Airport is on the west bank of the Nadym River.

Culture

The Museum of Tanya Savicheva operates in Nadym's School #2.

Interesting facts
Nadym was the nearest town to the point of greatest viewing of the solar eclipse of August 1, 2008.
The 1,524 mm (5 ft) broad-gauge Salekhard–Igarka Railway, which is also called "The Dead Road", passes through Nadym.
According to the documents published by the WikiLeaks magazine, the Nadym gas pipeline unit is named the most critical gas facility in the world.

International Relation

Twin Town & Sister City
Nadym was twinned with:
 Tromsø, Norway (until October 2022); Norwegian authorities gave  3 reasons for cutting ties.

Illustrations

See also

References

Notes

Sources

External links
Official website of Yamalo-Nenets Autonomous Okrug. Information about Nadym

Cities and towns in Yamalo-Nenets Autonomous Okrug
Populated places of Arctic Russia
Socialist planned cities